Vice Admiral Paul David Stroop (30 October 1904 – 17 May 1995) was an officer of the United States Navy and a Naval Aviator. He held numerous high-ranking staff positions in aviation from the 1930s onward, including World War II service on the staff of the Chief of Naval Operations.  During the late 1940s and early 1950s, he held various sea commands.  From 1959 to 1962, he oversaw the development of the Navy's aerial weapons, including early guided missiles, as chief of the Bureau of Naval Weapons.  During the later 1960s, he commanded Naval air forces in the Pacific.

Biography

Early life and career
Stroop  was born in Zanesville, Ohio, but grew up in Mobile, Alabama. He graduated from the United States Naval Academy in 1926, then spent the next two years on board the battleship . In 1928, he served as a member of U.S. gymnastic team at the Olympic Games in Amsterdam.

Naval aviation assignments
From 1928 to 1929, Stroop received flight training at Naval Air Station Pensacola, Florida, and in 1929 received his wings as a Naval Aviator.  His first aviation assignment was with Torpedo Squadron 9, based at NAS Norfolk, Virginia. In 1932 he was transferred to Patrol Squadron 10, also based at Norfolk.

From 1932 to 1934, he undertook postgraduate work at the Naval Academy. After completing his studies, he returned to Fleet assignments.  He served from 1934 to 1936 with Bombing Squadron 5, aboard the carrier .  From 1936 to 1937, he was Senior Aviator aboard the cruiser . In 1937, Stroop gained his first experience in the Naval Aviation material establishment when he was assigned to the Navy's Bureau of Aeronautics (BuAer).  He left BuAer in 1940 to join the staff of Admiral Aubrey Fitch, commander of Patrol Wing 2, based at Pearl Harbor, Hawaii. In 1940, Stroop became Flag Officer and Tactical Officer of Carrier Division 1 at San Diego.

World War II
After the United States entry into World War II, Stroop was transferred to Pearl Harbor.  In 1942, he joined the staff of the Carrier Task Force, aboard  at Pearl Harbor.  From 1942 to 1943, he served as Planning Officer to the Senior Naval Commander, Air Force, South Pacific.

He next gained his own command, serving from 1943 to 1944 as Commanding Officer of the seaplane tender . Stroop spent the last months of the war in Washington, D.C., serving from 1944 to 1945 in the Navy Department as Aviation Plans Officer on the Staff of Fleet Admiral Ernest J. King, the Chief of Naval Operations and Commander in Chief, U.S. Fleet. In this capacity, Stroop attended the Yalta, Quebec, and Potsdam Conferences, later making a trip around the world to inform commands of outcome of the Yalta Conference.

Post-war activities
In 1945, Stroop left the Navy Department to become Commanding Officer of the escort carrier . He served as Fleet Aviation Officer (later Chief of Staff, Operations), in the Fifth Fleet, based at Yokosuka, Japan, from 1945 to 1946, and then as Aviation Officer (later Assistant Chief of Staff) Operations to the Commander in Chief of the Pacific Fleet (CINCPACFLT), at Pearl Harbor, in 1946-1948.

From 1948 to 1950, Stroop served as Executive Officer at the Navy's General Line School in Monterey, California, then again took up his own studies as a student at the National War College at Washington, D.C., in 1950-1951.

In 1951, Stroop became Commanding Officer of the carrier  in the Sea of Japan during the Korean War. In 1953, he left the Essex to become Commanding Officer of the Naval Ordnance Test Station, China Lake, California.

From 1953 to 1955, he was Senior Member of the Weapons Systems Evaluation Group, Joint Chiefs of Staff, Navy Department, Washington.  From 1955 to 1957, he served as Deputy Chief at the Bureau of Ordnance (BuOrd).

From 1957 to 1958, he was Commanding Officer of the Taiwan Patrol Force based at Okinawa, Japan.  From 1959 to 1962 he was Chief of the Bureau of Naval Weapons.

Stroop served from 1962 to 1965 as Commanding Officer of the Naval Air Force, Pacific Fleet (COMNAVAIRPAC), and as Commanding Officer, First Fleet, Air PAC, with the rank of vice admiral.

He retired in 1965. After his retirement to the San Diego area, he was a consultant to Ryan Aeronautical and Teledyne Ryan of San Diego until 1992.

Stroop died at the Coronado Hospital in Coronado, California, on 17 May 1995, aged 90.

Personal life
Stroop was married to Esther Holscher Stroop from 1926 until her death in 1982. He was survived by his second wife, Kay Roeder Stroop; his two sons, two daughters, three stepdaughters, a stepson, 13 grandchildren, and 11 great-grandchildren. Stroop is buried at Fort Rosecrans National Cemetery.

References

 Grossnick, Roy et al.  "Part 8: The New Navy 1954-1959."  United States Naval Aviation 1910-1995."  4th edition.  Washington, D.C.: Naval Historical Center, 1997.  Online.  Naval Historical Center.  Viewed 24 February 2006. http://www.history.navy.mil/avh-1910/PART08.PDF 
 "Stroop, Paul D., VADM, USN, 1904-1995".  in A GUIDE TO ARCHIVES, MANUSCRIPTS AND ORAL HISTORIES IN THE NAVAL HISTORICAL COLLECTION. Naval War College, Newport, R.I.  2001.  Compiled by Evelyn M. Cherpak, Ph.D.  Online.  2001.  Naval War College.  Viewed 24 February 2006. https://web.archive.org/web/20051230173634/http://www.nwc.navy.mil/library/3Publications/NWCLibraryPublications/NavHistCollPubs/NHC%20Guide.doc [Source of biographical data]

 It also contains public-domain information collected from the Naval War College, an institution of the United States government.''

External links
China Lake Military Leadership - from the Naval Air Warfare Center Weapons Division, China Lake

1904 births
1995 deaths
People from Zanesville, Ohio
American people of Dutch descent
United States Naval Academy alumni
Gymnasts at the 1928 Summer Olympics
Olympic gymnasts of the United States
United States Naval Aviators
United States Navy personnel of World War II
United States Navy personnel of the Korean War
United States Navy admirals
Recipients of the Legion of Merit
Burials at Fort Rosecrans National Cemetery